John Christopher Muran (born December 4, 1961 in New York) is an American clinical psychologist and psychotherapy researcher.

Education 
John Christopher Muran graduated cum laude from The Hotchkiss School in 1980 and Hamilton College in 1984. He completed a doctorate in combined professional-scientific psychology at Hofstra University in 1989. He also completed postdoctoral training in cognitive therapy at the Clarke Institute of Psychiatry (University of Toronto) in 1990 and in psychoanalysis at the New York University Postdoctoral Program in 1998.

Career 
He is a Full Professor at the Gordon F. Derner School of Psychology, Adelphi University, where he holds the appointment of Associate Dean and served as training director for the doctoral program in clinical psychology (2009-2021). He is also Principal Investigator and Director of the Brief Psychotherapy Research Program at Mount Sinai Beth Israel (since 1990), which has been supported by grants from the National Institute of Mental Health, and is on faculty at Icahn School of Medicine at Mount Sinai. 
    
Muran's work has concentrated on the following topics: psychotherapy integration and difference, therapeutic relationship and therapeutic alliance, therapist position and experience, treatment impasse and failure, performance under pressure, theories on self, identity politics and intersubjectivity.  He has published over 150 papers and 10 books, including The Therapeutic Alliance (2010; with Jacques Barber), Dialogues on Difference (2007), Self-Relations in the Psychotherapy Process (2001), and Negotiating the Therapeutic Alliance (2000; with Jeremy Safran).

Muran is a fellow of the American Psychological Association (since 2007) and serves on its Advisory Steering Committee for Clinical Treatment Guidelines. He is past-president of the international Society for Psychotherapy Research (SPR)  and past-editor of its journal Psychotherapy Research.  He has also served on several editorial boards, including Journal of Consulting & Clinical Psychology and Clinical Psychology: Science & Practice. He has received other recognitions and honors for his accomplishments, including the National Register's Alfred M. Wellner Lifetime Achievement Award for Research Excellence and SPR's Senior Distinguished Career Award.

Personal life 
Muran married clinical psychologist Elisa Denise Ventur in 1992 with whom he has a son Andrew Christopher Muran.

Selected works

 Muran, J.C. & Eubanks, C.F. (2020). Therapist Performance under Pressure: Negotiating Emotion, Difference & Rupture. APA Books.
 Muran, J.C., & Barber, J.P., eds. (2010). The Therapeutic Alliance: An Evidence-Based Guide to Practice. Guilford Press (Italian translation).
 Muran, J.C., ed. (2007). Dialogues on Difference: Diversity Studies on the Therapeutic Relationship. APA Books.
 Muran, J.C., ed. (2001). Self-Relations in the Psychotherapy Process. APA Books.
 Safran, J.D. & Muran, J.C. (2000). Negotiating the Therapeutic Alliance: A Relational Treatment Guide. Guilford Press (Spanish & Italian translations).

References 

20th-century American scientists
20th-century psychologists
21st-century American scientists
Hofstra University alumni
Hamilton College (New York) alumni
Living people
Icahn School of Medicine at Mount Sinai faculty
Adelphi University faculty
Fellows of the American Psychological Association
1961 births